The Port of Zhongshan is a natural estuary port located on the coast of Zhongshan Prefectural Level city, Guangdong, People's Republic of China. It opens into the Pearl River Delta.

Setting
Port of Zhongshan extends on the West Shore of the Pearl River Delta between Zhuhai and Guangzhou.

History

Layout
The Port of Zhongshan is divided into three main port areas: 东有中山港区, 北有小榄港区, 南有神湾港区 
Zhongshan Port Area: located to the east of the city, on the Hengmen Canal (横门水道).
Xiaolan Port Area: to the north of the city, on the Xiaolan Canal (小榄水道)
Shenwan Port Area: to the south of the city, at the mouth of the Xijiang River (西江)

Administration

Operations

References

External links

Ports and harbours of China